Richard Edelson is the Anthony Brady Professor of Dermatology at the Yale School of Medicine. He is a past director of the Yale Cancer Center, and an elected fellow of both the American Society for Clinical Investigation and the Association of American Physicians. He is known for his research discoveries in non-Hodgkins lymphoma, particularly his early career introduction of the disease category concept of Cutaneous T Cell Lymphoma (CTCL), and his discovery of extracorporeal photochemotherapy (ECP) as an immunotherapy for cancer, transplant reactions and autoimmunity.

Education
Richard Edelson graduated from Hamilton College with an undergraduate degree in Chemistry, before earning his MD at the Yale School of Medicine in 1970. He then was further trained in Internal Medicine at the University of Chicago and Dermatology at Harvard.

Early career
From 1972 to 1975, he was an immunology research fellow at the National Cancer Institute, before becoming an assistant professor of dermatology at Columbia College of Physicians and Surgeons. He later became the Director of the Immunobiology Group in Columbia University's Comprehensive Cancer Center, Associate Director of that institution's General Clinical Research Center and Professor and Director of Research in Columbia's Dermatology Department. In 1986 he then returned to the Yale School of Medicine to become head of their Department of Dermatology.  He held that position until 2022, completing one of the longest departmental chairmanships in the history of Yale University.  While remaining a full-time Yale faculty member, he elected to relinquish his major administrative responsibilities to focus on his research team's efforts to extend his career-long efforts to produce T cell-based individualized cancer vaccines for the treatment of a broader range of immunogenic malignancies.

Yale career
Edelson is a former director of the Yale Cancer Center, serving in the role between 2003 and 2008. In that role he secured a renewed grant from the National Cancer Institute for $1.87 million annually, which has designated the Yale Cancer Center the only Comprehensive Cancer Center in southern New England as of the end of his tenure. Edelson then returned to his position as the chair of the Department of Dermatology at the Yale. That year he was also named the first Lerner Professor of Dermatology.

Research
Five innovations define his investigative career.  He discovered a cancer, elucidated its biology, originated a worldwide immunotherapy for it, led the team that found the key cell responsible for the efficacy of that therapy and directed advancing efforts to apply the derived principles to the development of personalized therapies for cancer and autoimmunity on a broad disease scale.  As a researcher Edelson developed the ECP treatment for cutaneous T-cell lymphoma during the 1980s. Much of his research during this time focused on looking to a patient's own immune system for therapeutics for different forms of cancer. This led to the first FDA-approved immunotherapy for cancer. Part of his discovery was that ECP's induction of dendritic antigen presenting cells (DC) is ECP's therapeutic link with the normal immune system. From this discovery he also developed the concept of transimmunization, an enhanced form of ECP, and method of potential treatment for leukemias, lymphomasm, and lung cancer. This research led to his founding of the company TransImmune AG. He also performed research into the use of photopheresis in cancer treatment, using ultraviolet light. His experiments included partnering with Columbia, the University of California at San Francisco, and the universities of Düsseldorf, Vienna and Pennsylvania.  While it had long been recognized by immunologists that DCs are the principal initiators of selective immunity and tolerance, the therapeutic potential of DCs had been unrealized due to a lack of knowledge of how these cells are produced by the body, where and when they are needed.  The Edelson laboratory program reverse engineered the clinical efficacy of ECP into the discovery that those physiologic DCs (phDCs), which naturally function successfully in experimental animals and humans, are produced by controllable and tunable platelet signaling of monocyte-to-dendritic cell maturation.  The broad therapeutic implications of this discovery are now being developed by a partnership between Yale University, the Gates Foundation and Transimmune AG.

Recognition
Edelson is an elected fellow of both the American Society for Clinical Investigation and the Association of American Physicians. He is also recipient of the Society of Investigative Dermatology's Rothman Award for Career Contribution, the Castle and Connolly's National Physician of the Year award, the American Skin Association's National Mentorship Award, and the Dermatology Foundation's Discovery Award. Of the more than two thousand graduates of the NIH Physician Scientist Training Program, he was one of eight selected physician-scientists whose investigative careers were featured in an eight-hour audiobook, narrated by actor Alan Alda, released by Audible.Com in December 2020, as a tribute to pivotal federally funded scientifically-driven medical advances.

References

Yale School of Medicine faculty
Living people
Hamilton College (New York) alumni
Yale School of Medicine alumni
Year of birth missing (living people)